Crimson lake may refer to:

 Crimson lake, pigment of a bright-red color
 Crimson Lake (Alberta), lake in Alberta, Canada 
 Crimson Lake Provincial Park, provincial park located in Alberta, Canada

See also 

 Carmine (disambiguation)